Adhartal - Habibganj Intercity Express  is a daily Express Train of the Indian Railways, which runs between  railway station of Jabalpur, one of the important city & military cantonment hub of Central Indian state Madhya Pradesh and  the railway station in Bhopal, the capital city of Madhya Pradesh.

Number and nomenclature
The number allowted for the train is :
22187 - From Bhopal to Jabalpur
22188 - From Jabalpur to Bhopal

Arrival and departure
Train no. 22187 departs from Bhopal daily at 05:20 Hrs, reaching Jabalpur, by forenoon at 10:50.
Train no. 22188 departs from Jabalpur daily at 16:10 Hrs reaching Bhopal, the same evening by 22:00

Routes and halts
The train goes via Itarsi Junction. The important halt of the train are :

BHOPAL HABIBGANJ
Hoshangabad
Itarsi Junction
Pipariya
Gadarwara
Kareli
Narsinghpur
Sri Dham
Jabalpur Madan Mahal
JABALPUR JUNCTION

Locomotive
The train is hauled by ET WDM3 diesel locomotive of the Itarsi Shed

Coach composite
The train consists of 11 coaches as follows:
1 AC CHAIR CAR
5 RESERVED CHAIR CAR
5 UNRESERVED CHAIR CAR

References

External links
22187 Adhartal Habibganj Intercity Express
22188 Habibganj Adhartal Intercity Express

Notes

Rail transport in Madhya Pradesh
Transport in Bhopal
Transport in Jabalpur
Railway services introduced in 2002
Intercity Express (Indian Railways) trains